Felix McGuire (1847 – 6 April 1915) was an independent conservative Member of Parliament in New Zealand.

He was elected to the Egmont electorate in a 1891 by-election after the resignation of Harry Atkinson, and represented it until the end of the 12th Parliament in 1896. He successfully contested the Hawera electorate in the 1896 general election and served until he was defeated in the 1902 general election. He once again stood (unsuccessfully) for Hawera in 1905.

McGuire died on 6 April 1915 at his home in the Auckland suburb of Epsom, and was buried in Waikaraka Cemetery.

References

1847 births
1915 deaths
Members of the New Zealand House of Representatives
New Zealand MPs for North Island electorates
Independent MPs of New Zealand
Unsuccessful candidates in the 1890 New Zealand general election
Unsuccessful candidates in the 1902 New Zealand general election
Unsuccessful candidates in the 1905 New Zealand general election
Unsuccessful candidates in the 1887 New Zealand general election
Burials at Waikaraka Cemetery
19th-century New Zealand politicians